The 2003 Commonwealth of Independent States Cup was the eleventh edition of the competition between the champions of former republics of Soviet Union. It was won by Sheriff Tiraspol for the first time.

Participants

 1 Lokomotiv Moscow were represented by reserve/youth players.
 2 Azerbaijan U21 replaced Shamkir (2001–02 Azerbaijan champions) since Azerbaijan Premier League was suspended for 2002–03 season and all clubs were inactive, outside of occasional friendly matches. The team was also reinforced with a few overage players.

Group stage

Group A

Results

Group B

Results

Group C
Unofficial table

Official table

Results

Group D
Unofficial table

Official table

Results

Final rounds

Quarterfinals

Semifinals

Final

Top scorers

External links
2003 CIS Cup at rsssf.com
2003 CIS Cup at football.by
2003 CIS Cup at kick-off.by
2003 CIS Cup official website

2003
2003 in Russian football
2002–03 in Ukrainian football
2002–03 in European football
January 2003 sports events in Russia
2003 in Moscow